Byzantium is the third studio album by alternative rock band Deep Blue Something. It was released on Interscope in 1998 only in Japan and some European countries.

Track listing
 "Daybreak and a Candle End" – 4:42
 "So Precious"1 – 3:04
 "She Is"1 – 3:26
 "Cherry Lime Rickey" – 6:26
 "Byzantium" – 4:07
 "Everything" – 3:32
 "Enough To Get By"1 – 5:10
 "Hell In Itself"1 – 4:08
 "Dr. Crippen" – 4:00
 "Tonight" – 3:43
 "William H. Bonney" – 4:43
 "Pullman, Washington" – 3:51
 "Light the Fuse" – 3:41
 "Parkbench"1 – 5:00
 "Becoming Light" – 4:46

Footnotes:
1 The five tracks were later featured in their 2001 album Deep Blue Something.

Personnel

Band members
 Todd Pipes – bass guitar, lead & backing vocals
 Toby Pipes – acoustic & electric guitars, lead & backing vocals
 Clay Bergus – acoustic & electric guitars, backing vocals
 John Kirtland – drums, percussion

Additional personnel
 Charles Fisher – producer 
 Joe Chiccarelli – engineer 
 Stephen Marcussen – mastering 
 Tim Palmer – mixing 
 Bobby Torres – assistant engineer 
 Robert Manning – assistant engineer 
 David Leonard – additional engineer 
 Dave Thoener – additional engineer 
 Glenn Spinner – additional assistant engineer 
 Matt Silva – assistant mixing engineer 
 Jeff Roe – trombone, horn arrangements
 Randy Burgeson – trumpet
 Dave Lown – tenor saxophone
 Dave Monsch – baritone saxophone 
 Peter Hyrka – violin, string arrangements
 David Angel – violin
 Cate Myer – violin
 Alan Umstead – violin
 Gary Tussing – cello
 Ron de la Vega – cello
 Paulinho De Costa – percussion
 Chuck Reed – A&R
 Gil Pena – cover illustration
 Robert Greeson – art direction, photography
 Marina Chavez – photography
 Richard Storms – photography
 Mike Swinford – management for Rainmaker Artists
 Paul Nugent – management for Rainmaker Artists
 Dale Brock – touring
 Michelle McAnally – touring assistant

References

1998 albums
Deep Blue Something albums
Interscope Records albums
Albums produced by Charles Fisher (producer)